The 88th Scripps National Spelling Bee was held at the Gaylord National Resort & Convention Center in National Harbor, Maryland from May 24–28, 2015. Students competed for a prize valued at $38,600 coming from various companies.

Competition
For the second year in a row the outcome was a tie, with Gokul Venkatachalam and Vanya Shivashankar ending up as co-winners once the Bee's dictionary was emptied. Vanya was the first sibling of a previous winner to win; her sister Kavya won in 2009. Vanya Shivashankar from Olathe, Kansas (in her fifth appearance at the Bee) and Gokul Venkatachalam from Chesterfield, Missouri (who finished third the prior year) won the bee, making a total of thirteenth of the past seventeen bees up to and including it to have had an Indian-American champion. Other finalists included Cole Shafer-Ray, Snehaa Ganesh Kumar, Siddharth Krishnakumar, Dev Jaiswal, Tejas Muthusamy, Paul Keaton, Sylvie Lamontagne, and Siyona Mishra.

There were 283 spellers this year. 285 were scheduled to participate (2 did not attend), 146 girls and 139 boys, ranging from age 9 to 15. 67% attended public schools. Forty-nine spellers from the original field made it to the final day of competition.

Word list championship round

References

Scripps National Spelling Bee competitions
2015 in Maryland
2015 in education
May 2015 events in the United States
Oxon Hill, Maryland